The 2004 Fukuoka Daiei Hawks season is the 67th season of the franchise in Nippon Professional Baseball, their 11th season in Fukuoka Dome, and their 15th and final season under Daiei, because SoftBank Group would take over the Hawks' ownership the following season and rebrand them as the Fukuoka SoftBank Hawks. This also is the team's 9th season under manager Sadaharu Oh.

Regular Season and Postseason 
The Hawks finished in first, going 77-52-4, for a .594 winning percentage, a bit close to the .600 winning percentage. The Hawks eventually got eliminated by the Seibu Lions in the 2nd stage.

Note: A players' strike in September over the merger of the Orix BlueWave and Osaka Kintetsu Buffaloes shortened the season by only 2 games.

Fukuoka SoftBank Hawks seasons
2004 Nippon Professional Baseball season